Marlowfjellet is a mountain in Nathorst Land at Spitsbergen, Svalbard. It has three peaks of 1,052, 1,016 and 1,022,  m.a.s.l., respectively, and extends over a length of about six kilometers. The mountain is surrounded by the glaciers of Sysselmannbreen and Steenstrupbreen. It is named after Norwegian mining engineer and military officer Wolmer Tycho Marlow.

References

Mountains of Spitsbergen